Cedar Township may refer to:

Arkansas
 Cedar Township, Carroll County, Arkansas
 Cedar Township, Polk County, Arkansas, in Polk County, Arkansas
 Cedar Township, Scott County, Arkansas, in Scott County, Arkansas

Illinois
 Cedar Township, Knox County, Illinois

Iowa
 Cedar Township, Benton County, Iowa
 Cedar Township, Black Hawk County, Iowa
 Cedar Township, Calhoun County, Iowa
 Cedar Township, Cherokee County, Iowa
 Cedar Township, Floyd County, Iowa
 Cedar Township, Greene County, Iowa
 Cedar Township, Jefferson County, Iowa
 Cedar Township, Johnson County, Iowa
 Cedar Township, Lee County, Iowa
 Cedar Township, Lucas County, Iowa
 Cedar Township, Mahaska County, Iowa
 Cedar Township, Mitchell County, Iowa
 Cedar Township, Monroe County, Iowa
 Cedar Township, Muscatine County, Iowa
 Cedar Township, Pocahontas County, Iowa
 Cedar Township, Sac County, Iowa
 Cedar Township, Van Buren County, Iowa
 Cedar Township, Washington County, Iowa

Kansas
 Cedar Township, Chase County, Kansas
 Cedar Township, Cowley County, Kansas
 Cedar Township, Jackson County, Kansas
 Cedar Township, Smith County, Kansas, in Smith County, Kansas
 Cedar Township, Wilson County, Kansas

Michigan
 Cedar Township, Osceola County, Michigan

Minnesota
 Cedar Township, Marshall County, Minnesota
 Cedar Township, Martin County, Minnesota

Missouri
 Cedar Township, Boone County, Missouri
 Cedar Township, Callaway County, Missouri
 Cedar Township, Cedar County, Missouri
 Cedar Township, Dade County, Missouri
 Cedar Township, Pettis County, Missouri

Nebraska
 Cedar Township, Antelope County, Nebraska
 Cedar Township, Buffalo County, Nebraska
 Cedar Township, Nance County, Nebraska

North Dakota
 Cedar Township, Adams County, North Dakota

South Dakota
 Cedar Township, Hand County, South Dakota, in Hand County, South Dakota

Township name disambiguation pages